Kramer Guitars is an American manufacturer of electric guitars and basses.  Kramer produced aluminum-necked electric guitars and basses in the 1970s and wooden-necked guitars catering to hard rock and heavy metal musicians in the 1980s; Kramer is currently a division of Gibson Guitar Corporation.

Formation

There is some dispute over the company's early history but it begins with Travis Bean, a California luthier who was building guitars with aluminum necks. Bean and Gary Kramer started the Travis Bean guitar company in 1974, in Sun Valley, and while their guitars did well, Bean lost interest and left most of the business aspects to Kramer and so the two parted ways.

Kramer then founded the company that still bears his name, improving on the Bean design—Bean's necks were heavy and the material felt cold to the touch. Kramer's improvement consisted of two wooden inserts in the back of the neck. By 1975 he had hooked up with a friend from New York, Dennis Berardi and the two founded BK International, which engaged luthier Phil Petillo to make prototypes for them. Other involved parties were Henry Vaccaro, a real estate businessman who invested money in the venture and Peter LaPlaca, who had experience with Norlin, the company that owned Gibson Guitar Corporation from 1969 to 1986. The rest of the account is murky: Kramer says he was supposed to increase production but was too inexperienced in that area so he wanted to move back to the West Coast. He was to sell back his interests and receive royalties then represent the company out west but none of this seems to have happened.

1970s: aluminum necks
Introduced in 1976, early models featured the trademark "tuning fork head" aluminum-reinforced necks with a fretboard made of Ebonol—material similar to one used in bowling ball production.  Other features of the necks included aluminum dots, and a zero fret. Gary Kramer's inserts, set in epoxy, were usually walnut or maple.  The bodies were usually made of high grade Walnut or Maple, with the earliest instruments made of exotic tonewoods including Koa, Afromosia, Swietenia, Shedua, and Bubinga.  The hardware was also from a known quality brand: Schaller tuning keys and bridges; Schaller and DiMarzio pickups; custom-made strap pins; aluminum cavity covers. Kramer's "alumi-neck" line lasted roughly until 1982.

Generally, the ratio of basses to guitars produced was about 4:1, primarily because bass players were more willing to experiment.  By 1981, Kramer had the tools, and the experience, to take guitar mass production to a new level.  Switching to wooden-necked instruments both held the promise of keeping production costs low as well as being able to appeal to traditionally-minded guitar players.

Wooden neck period
Kramer first released wooden-necked guitars in late 1981, following Charvel's lead on producing instruments that essentially copied the Stratocaster headstock shape from Fender, in violation of Fender's US trademark and design patent.  After only a thousand or so instruments were built, in May 1981, Kramer received a cease and desist order from Fender to halt the production of strathead guitars. Instead, Kramer opted for a "beak" headstock reminiscent of 1960s Kent guitar headstocks. The earliest beak guitars were in fact stratheads with a lopped off headstock; these can be identified by prominent sanding marks on the curve of the headstock. Later and most common beak guitars were manufactured with a beak headstock from the factory.

Wooden-necked instruments represented Kramer's first foray into offshoring the production of guitar components to Eastern Asia. Tuning keys and vintage fulcrum tremolos were made by Gotoh in Japan, while the necks were made by Japan's ESP Guitars and shipped to New Jersey for fretting and finishing.

Kramer executives saw that the guitar techniques of the early 1980s demanded a high-performance tremolo system.  Kramer partnered with a German inventor named Helmut Rockinger, and installed his bulky tremolos, precursors to Floyd Rose systems, on its instruments.

Early to mid-1980s
A chance encounter between Dennis Berardi and Eddie Van Halen's managers on an airplane flight set the foundation for Kramer's meteoric rise in the 1980s.  Eddie was interested in a tremolo that stayed in tune, which the Rockinger system offered. A meeting between Eddie Van Halen and Kramer execs took place, and Eddie was sold. At the meeting, he reportedly quipped that he would help make Kramer the "#1 guitar company in the world." 

By 1983, the Rockinger tremolo (sometimes dubbed "The Eddie Van Halen tremolo") had been widely replaced by the Floyd Rose system. In addition, Kramer once again offered Schaller tuners on their guitars, tapping Schaller to produce Floyd Rose tremolos as well. Kramer was the only guitar company offering Original Floyd Rose tremolos stock on their production guitars, a competitive advantage of Kramer over other guitar manufacturers of the period.

In late 1983, Kramer switched from the "beak" headstock design to the Gibson Explorer-like "hockey stick" headstock design. This distinctive look also helped rank Kramer highly with guitar enthusiasts. One notable Kramer guitar was the Baretta model, which was a single-humbucker instrument similar to guitars Eddie Van Halen used on stage. The Kramer Baretta was the flagship of the Kramer line and helped popularize the single-pickup 1980s superstrat guitar design.

By late 1985, Kramer began installing Seymour Duncan pickups in its guitars, in preference to the more vintage-sounding Schaller pickups. When the sales figures came in, Kramer was the best-selling guitar brand of 1985.

In 1986, Kramer switched to the radically drooped "pointy headstock" design. Schaller tuners, Floyd Rose tremolos, Seymour Duncan pickups and exciting graphics by talented factory artists such as Dennis Kline helped propel Kramer to become the best-selling guitar brand of 1986.

Late 1980s
Kramer continued its success into the late 1980s, promoting hard rock and glam metal artists from Mötley Crüe's Mick Mars to Whitesnake's Vivian Campbell as major endorsees.

By 1987, Kramer was using ESP Guitars exclusively for manufacturing its necks and bodies. The "American Series" of instruments were ESP parts, assembled in Neptune, New Jersey. The Aerostar series were made completely in Korea, while the Focus series was made and assembled by ESP Guitars.  Some early Focus guitars were also made in Japan by the Matsumoku company.

During 1987, Kramer also commissioned guitarist Rich Excellente, designer of the "1957 Chevy Tail-fin" guitar, to create a series of guitars based on the patented features Excellente developed on his "Chevy Tail-Fin" guitar. Kramer, under license from Excellente, manufactured a line of guitars which were marketed as "The Kramer American Showster Series". These guitars were sleeker versions of the more traditional shapes of the day, and utilized Excellente's patented "tear-drop" body taper and "metal loading" insert feature to increase tone and sustain.(U.S.Pat.4,635,522). Fewer than 1,000 of these guitars were produced between 1988–1990, and the line was discontinued during 1990 due to manufacturing problems which began to plague Kramer during that time.

In addition, Kramer embraced the excess of the late 1980s—producing slick and fluorescent guitars, losing its thought leadership in the guitar manufacturing arena, and damaging the image of the brand. Similarly, the image of the Kramer brand was being tarnished by an influx of Aerostar guitars, lower in quality and made with cheap parts.

By 1989, Dennis Berardi had started Berardi/Thomas Entertainment, Inc—an artist management company. Seeing promise in a young band out of the Soviet Union, Gorky Park, BTE started managing the group. To help promote the band, the infamous "Gorky Park" guitars were made, reportedly to be given to guitar dealers as promotional pieces. BTE banked on the Gorky Park guitars to help promote the group. When the Russian band achieved only a mild measure of success, this was a significant, and final blow to the first incarnation of the Kramer company.

1990–present
The original Kramer company effectively came to an end in January 1991, mostly due to financial problems. The company had been spending huge amounts on advertising and endorsements, and then lost a lawsuit with Floyd D. Rose over royalties. A notorious firesale of surplus necks, bodies and hardware was held out of New Jersey. In the early '90s, Artist Relations manager Billy "Falcon" Connolly left New Jersey and moved to Princeton, West Virginia and started a small guitar company called Falcon Custom Guitars. Billy made beautiful hand made acoustic and electric guitars that are cherished by his Kramer fans. Falcon Custom Guitars met its untimely end late summer of 1999 when Billy died.

By 1995, Henry Vaccaro Sr. owned the Kramer brand; in addition, he was the only one of the original partners interested in continuing in the guitar business. He tried one last time to produce Kramer guitars from surplus parts, in the Neptune plant, but only a few hundred were made. Henry Vaccaro Sr. started making aluminum-necked guitars under the name Vaccaro Guitars, but that, too, was short-lived.

In 2005, the original founder and namesake of Kramer Guitars, Gary Kramer, started his own guitar company: Gary Kramer Guitars.
In 2007, the original service manager of Kramer Guitars, legendary luthier Paul Unkert started his own guitar company, featuring designs reminiscent of aluminum-era Kramers: Unk Guitars.

The Kramer brand was sold out of bankruptcy to Gibson Guitar Corporation.  Gibson's Epiphone division has produced guitars and basses under the Kramer brand since the late 1990s, mostly factory-direct through the now-defunct MusicYo.com website. Encouraged by the resurgence of interest in the Kramer brand, Epiphone has been reissuing classic Kramer models, including the "1984 Model;" (a homage to Eddie Van Halen's famous "5150" guitar used from 1984-1991) the "Jersey Star;" (a homage to the Richie Sambora signature 1980s Kramer) and most recently, the "1985 Baretta Reissue (A standard slant-pickup Baretta)". These high-end instruments are assembled in the USA from American components. In January 2009, Gibson shut down the MusicYo.com website, instead promising that Kramers would be available through dealers and in music stores by the end of 2009. But supply was not consistent and promised new models were either seriously delayed or never produced.

More recently however under guidance from a dedicated Kramer team at Gibson, new models have made it to stores, and now includes the budget priced Baretta Special (a model touted on the MusicYo pages but never released until now) plus designs never seen before including the Pariah & Assault (including FR tremolo models) ranges brought out to bring the Kramer name to a new generation of rock musicians, while homages to vintage models like the Stagemaster in the form of the SM-1 and Classic Pacer Imperial now simply called the Pacer Vintage are also still produced.

In 2007, a Kramer Striker controller was created for Guitar Hero III for the PlayStation 2, under a licensing agreement with Gibson Guitar Corporation. A Kramer Focus was also available as an in-game guitar, as was one of the earlier aluminum neck model Kramers. The Kramer Fatboy has been featured in Guitar Hero III: Legends of Rock and Guitar Hero: Aerosmith.

Original Kramer guitars are now highly collectable, after being considered undesirable in the early-mid-1990s. They regularly fetch high prices on eBay and other auction sites.  Kramer collectors held a Kramer Expo every year in Nashville, Tennessee, near the Gibson plant, from 2003-2008.  More recently, expos have been held annually in locations around Europe including the Netherlands, Newcastle upon Tyne in 2006 & 2007, and Liverpool, UK in 2010 & 2012, to showcase and celebrate Kramer guitars.

Kramer Models

Kramer Aluminum Neck Guitars
 Kramer 250
 Kramer 335 (Hollowbody) - Only one known.
 Kramer 350
 Kramer 450
 Kramer 650
 Kramer DMZ series
 Kramer XL series
 Kramer XK series
 Kramer Duke series
 Kramer Gene Simmons axe guitar and bass
 Kramer Challenger

Kramer USA and American
(Please Note: Kramers listed below were not built in USA post 1986. Only Assembled.)
 Kramer Baretta I, II, and III
 Kramer Stagemaster
 Kramer Classic
 Kramer Condor
 Kramer Liberty
 Kramer Pacer
 Kramer Pacer Custom I & II
 Kramer Pioneer Bass
 Kramer Forum I & II Basses
 Kramer Proaxe
 Kramer Triax
 Kramer Enterprize
 Kramer Invader
 Kramer Vanguard
 Kramer Voyager
 Kramer Sustainer
 Kramer Telecaster

Kramer USA and American – signature models
 Kramer Floyd Rose Model
 Kramer Elliot Easton Model
 Kramer NightSwan (Vivian Campbell Model)
 Kramer Sambora (aka "Jersey Star") (Richie Sambora Model)
 Kramer Ripley (Steve Ripley Model)
 Kramer Gorky Park model
 Kramer Paul Dean model

Kramer Overseas – made in Czech Republic
 Kramer Pacer (S Serial Number, No "American" on headstock)
 NOTE*** These guitars may have been produced after the 1990 closure of Neptune, NJ Kramer.

Kramer Overseas – made in Japan
 Kramer Focus Series
 Kramer Forum III & IV Basses

 Kramer JK, LK, MK Series 
 Kramer Glide
 Kramer Grace
(Made for Japanese market)

Kramer Overseas – made in Korea
 NEPTUNE ERA***
 Kramer Aerostar (ZX)
 Kramer Ferrington
 Kramer Gorky Park Model
 Kramer KS-400, KS400
 Kramer Metallist
 Kramer Regent
 Kramer Savant
 Kramer Showster
 Kramer Starfighter
 Kramer Striker Series
 Kramer Hundred Series
 Kramer XL series

Kramer by Gibson – USA-made Models
 Kramer 1985 Baretta Reissue
 Kramer The 84
 Kramer Baretta Special
 Kramer Focus
 Kramer Jersey Star
 Kramer Nightswan
 Kramer Pacer
 Kramer SM-1

Kramer by Gibson '98–'08 – Korean Made Models (1998–2005)
 also known as "The Yo Era Guitars"**
 Kramer Pacer (2xx)
 Kramer Striker (fr/s 4xx)
 Kramer Baretta Neck-Thru
 Kramer Baretta bolt on
 Kramer Vanguard (fr/s 4xx)
 Kramer Assault (2xx)
 Kramer Imperial

References

External links

 
 NAMM Oral History Interview with Gary Kramer September 10, 2009
 Kramer Guitars History (Interview with Gary Kramer) PT1 & PT2
 Kramer Korner Interview with former Kramer Guitars President, Dennis Berardi
 Kramer Korner Interview with Henry Vaccaro Sr

Guitar manufacturing companies of the United States
Bass guitar manufacturing companies
American companies established in 1976
1976 establishments in New Jersey
Gibson Brands
Companies that filed for Chapter 11 bankruptcy in 2018